Jesse Juntheikki (born March 10, 1988) is a Finnish professional ice hockey centre currently playing for Brest Albatros Hockey of the FFHG Division 1.

Juntheikki previously played in Mestis for Kiekko-Vantaa, Jukurit, HCK, Hermes and Ketterä. On May 25, 2019, he moved to France and signed for Ligue Magnus side Rapaces de Gap. He departed from the team by November after just ten games and joined Division 1 team Brest.

References

External links

1988 births
Living people
Brest Albatros Hockey players
Finnish ice hockey centres
Imatran Ketterä players
Kiekko-Vantaa players
Kokkolan Hermes players
Mikkelin Jukurit players
People from Tuusula
Rapaces de Gap players
Sportspeople from Uusimaa